The Liga Dominicana de Fútbol 2021 is the seventh season of the LDF, the Dominican Republic's professional football league.

Competition system 

The Liga Dominicana de Futbol tournament will consist of three parts:
  'Regular Season:'  A system of all against all will be played. Each team will play a total of 9 games in their own field and in the opposite field, making a total of 18 games. The top 6 teams at the end of the Regular Season will advance to the League.

The order of classification of the teams will be determined in a general calculation table, as follows:

 1) Higher amount of points;
 2) Greater goal difference in favor; in case of equality;
 3) Higher number of goals scored; in case of equality;
 4) Highest number of away goals scored; in case of equality;
 5) Less amount of red cards received; in case of equality;
 6) Less quantity of yellow cards received; in case of equality;
 7) Draw.

  'Liguilla:'  The 6 teams classified from the regular season will play a system of all against all. Each team will play a total of 5 matches in their own field and in the opposite field, making a total of 10 rounds. The top 4 teams at the end of the League will advance to the Play-offs. The ranking order will be the same as for the Regular Season.

  'Play-offs:'  An elimination system will be played, the first place in the Liguilla will face the fourth place and the second place will face the third. Both keys will be played in two games and the winners will advance to the Grand Final, which will also be played in two games.

Classification for international competitions 

The champion and runner-up of the 'Grand Final' will have a place in the CFU Club Championship

Participating Teams 
A total of 10 teams will compete in the 2021 Tournament.

Teams by Province

Team Information

Regular season

Liguilla 
<onlyinclude>

References 

https://futboldominicano.net/equipos-de-la-liga-dominicana-de-futbol/

Football in the Dominican Republic
Liga Dominicana de Fútbol seasons
Dominican Republic
Dominican Republic
2021 in Dominican Republic sport